The Indian cricket team toured South Africa for two Tests from 1 November to 20 November 2001. South Africa won the Test series 1–0.

Test matches

1st Test

2nd Test

Unofficial 3rd Test

See also
 Mike Denness and Indian cricket team incident

External links
 Tour page ESPNcricinfo
 Record ESPNcricinfo
 Cricarchive

2001 in Indian cricket
2001 in South African cricket
2001–02 South African cricket season
2001-02
International cricket competitions in 2001–02